The Nippi NP-100 Albatross was a Japanese two side-by-side seat motorized glider, powered by a ducted fan rather than the usual propeller. It did not go into production.

Design and development

The Albatross was the first Japanese motorized glider, unusual in being powered by a ducted fan.  Design work started in late 1973 and the first flight of the NP-100 prototype was made on 25 December 1975. After a period of testing in 1976 led to several modifications and a change of name to NP-100A.  There was another period of testing in the second quarter of 1978 to finalize the configuration and power plant of production aircraft. Despite this, the Albatross was not put into production.

Apart from its power unit, the Albatross was a fairly conventional high-wing monoplane glider. Its wing was an all-metal, single-spar structure and of unswept, straight-tapered plan.  There were plain ailerons and two-part flaps; the inboard and outboard sections of the flaps were linked, but the inboard part had greater deflections and could be used as an air brake.  The tail surfaces were also all-metal and straight-tapered; the horizontal surfaces were mounted on top of the fuselage.

The fuselage was a standard all-metal semi-monocoque, with the side-by-side seats under a long, low rearward-sliding two-piece canopy, with its rear at the wing leading edge. The Albatross's undercarriage had two main wheels side by side, attached to the fuselage and retracting forward into it.  Its tail wheel was steerable via the rudder bar. A modified motorcycle engine, located in the centre of the fuselage, drove a four-blade wooded ducted fan.  This drew in air through intakes in the fuselage sides with slatted doors, closed when the engine was off, and exhausted ventrally just behind the trailing edge under the slender rear fuselage.

Variants
NP-100 First version, flown 25 December 1975
NP-100A Post-1976 modified version, 80 kg (176 lb) heavier.

Specifications (NP-100)

References

External links
Wortmann FX-67-K-170 airfoil

1970s Japanese sailplanes